Kal Sefid (also Romanized as Kal Sefīd and Kal Safīd; also known as Gel Safīd and Gel Sefied) is a village in Satar Rural District, Kolyai District, Sonqor County, Kermanshah Province, Iran. At the 2006 census, its population was 227, in 63 families.

References 

Populated places in Sonqor County